Kent Isaacs, a Swedish producer, mixer, musician, songwriter and music-entrepreneur, is co-owner and operator of Cosmos Music, an independent Scandinavian music company. Isaacs has been known to work with Robyn, RZA, Slick Rick, Yusuf Islam (Cat Stevens), Clay Aiken, Eagle Eye Cherry, Infinite Mass, Arnthor and Stina Nordenstam (showcased on the hit 1996 soundtrack to Romeo + Juliet).

A music industry veteran, Isaacs has been in the business since the early 1980s. He began his career as a musician both in the studio and touring with Swedish artists. From there, he transitioned beyond the stage and studio to the technical side where he acted as producer, mixer and technician alongside numerous Grammy-winning and well-known selling artists, both international and Swedish including Robyn, Eagle Eye Cherry and others. Isaacs has owned and maintained large established studios including Cosmos Studios. The first Cosmos Studios got sold to Max Martin, who produced and recorded a lot of Internationally known Grammy/Platinum winning artist at Cosmos Studios who changed its name to Maratone Studios. After selling that studio he bought the formerly EMI-Abbey Road Studios, in Stockholm which became Cosmos Studios. Kent Isaacs sold Cosmos Studios in 2014 and it is now called as Baggpipe Studios.

Isaacs transcended the idea of a traditional musician/mixer/producer moving once again to the business side of the industry, working as a consultant with agreements and issues related to the business. He operated his own publishing company and producer-house.

He acquired Bonnier Amigo, now Cosmos Music - Scandinavia's largest independent network of music companies. 
Cosmos Music acquired Scandinavian Songs, one of them he sold to the biggest independent music publishing company in Sweden. Now remake to Cosmos Music Publishing

As a child actor and as such touring all over Sweden he kept acting during his years in the music scene in Stockholm. Continued in a series of award-winning commercials but it was when he relocated to Los Angeles in 2012, that a street casting led him back into acting. 
Currently doing commercials for established international brands, Kent has also been cast into different movies and TV shows by talented and visionary directors and is excited to work as an actor again.

Cosmos Studios
Cosmos Studios was a songwriting and recording facility in Stockholm, Sweden. It originally opened in the early sixties as Abbey Road/EMI Studios and has since been a creative hub for Scandinavian and international artists, songwriters and producers such as Lady Gaga, Jennifer Lopez, Keane, Korn, Beyoncé, Swedish House Mafia, John Martyn and Robyn

Cosmos Studios was closely affiliated with his company Cosmos-Music.

References

Year of birth missing (living people)
Living people
Swedish record producers